Ida S. Baker High School is a public high school located in Cape Coral, Florida. The school was founded in 2004, and is one of six high schools located in Cape Coral. For the 2011–12 school year it was rated as an "A+" school in the State of Florida.

History
Ida Baker founding principal of Cape Coral High School and Lee County's first black female high school principal. Cape Coral's Ida Baker High School was renamed in her honor. Ida Baker worked in the Lee County school system as a teacher and administrator. She became Cape Coral High School's first principal in 1977 and became an administrator at the Florida Department of Education in 1986. After her death in 1992, educators created a statewide award for excellence in her honor: The Ida S. Baker Distinguished Minority Educator Award.

Classes available
ART

BUILDING

BUSINESS, FINANCE, AND INFORMATION TECHNOLOGY

JOURNALISM

CRIMINAL JUSTICE

"DRAMA"
Drama 1, 2, 3

DRIVER'S EDUCATION
Driver's Education

ENGINEERING AND MANUFACTURING

SPANISH/LANGUAGE ARTS

FIREFIGHTING
Firefighting 1, 2, 3

FOREIGN LANGUAGE

WELLNESS
Health Opportunities through Physical Education (H.O.P.E.)

INTENSIVE READING
Intensive Reading

MATHEMATICS

MEDICAL

MUSIC 

PE

ROTC-MILITARY SCIENCE
Leadership Education 1, 2, 3, 4

SCIENCE

SOCIAL STUDIES

TEACHING

References

The Ida S. Baker High School 2010-2011 Student Handbook

External links
 School website
 Ida S Baker High School, National Center for Education Statistics
Ida S. Baker at greatschools.net

Educational institutions established in 2004
High schools in Lee County, Florida
Public high schools in Florida
Cape Coral, Florida
2004 establishments in Florida